The 2019 World Cup Taekwondo Team Championships was the 11th edition of the World Cup Taekwondo Team Championships, and was held in Wuxi, China from August 23 to August 25, 2019.

The main bracket consisted of a single elimination tournament, culminating in the gold medal match. Two bronze medals were awarded at the competitions. A repechage was used to determine the bronze medal winners. Iran won the gold medal in men's competition while China won the remaining events.

Medalists

Men

Women

Mixed

References

Men's Team Results
Women's Team Results
Mixed Team Results

External links
Official website

World Cup
World Cup Taekwondo Team Championships
Taekwondo Championships
Taekwondo